Bruno Felipe de Oliveira (born 1 February 1998), known as Bruno Oliveira or Bruninho, is a Brazilian footballer who plays as an attacking midfielder for South Korean club Seoul E-Land FC.

Club career

Early career
Born in Vinhedo, São Paulo, Bruno Oliveira was released by Corinthians and subsequently represented Bragantino and Red Bull Brasil as a youth. In July 2018, he joined XV de Piracicaba for the Copa Paulista, and made his senior debut on 4 August of that year by coming on as a second-half substitute for Marcelo Fernandes in a 3–3 home draw against former side Red Bull Brasil.

For the 2019 season, Bruno Oliveira represented Grêmio Osasco and Caldense, while still owned by RB Brasil, and signed permanently with Grêmio Osasco in July 2019.

Caldense
In July 2020, Bruno Oliveira returned to Caldense on loan, but his loan spell only lasted one month as the tournaments were postponed due to the COVID-19 pandemic; in October, he signed a permanent deal with the latter club. He featured regularly in the 2021 Campeonato Mineiro, and notably scored a goal against Vasco da Gama in the 2021 Copa do Brasil.

Loan to Vitória
On 3 May 2021, Bruno Oliveira was loaned to Vitória until November. He made his club debut late in the month, playing the last 20 minutes of a 1–1 away draw against Guarani.

Bruno Oliveira subsequently became a starter, and scored his first goal for the Leão da Barra on 3 July 2021, netting the equalizer in a 1–1 home draw against Goiás. Despite scoring twice and providing three assists in 30 league appearances, he suffered team relegation.

Loan to Santos

On 22 December 2021, Santos president Andrés Rueda confirmed the signing of Bruno Oliveira for the 2022 season. On 3 January of the following year, his one-year loan deal was confirmed by the club.

Bruno Oliveira made his debut for Peixe on 26 January 2022, replacing Camacho in a 0–0 Campeonato Paulista away draw against Inter de Limeira. On 22 November 2022, Santos announced that his buyout clause would not be exercised, and he subsequently left the club.

Seoul E-Land
On 17 February 2023, Bruno Oliveira moved abroad for the first time in his career, and joined Seoul E-Land FC of South Korean K League 2.

Career statistics

References

External links
Santos FC profile 

1998 births
Living people
Footballers from São Paulo (state)
Brazilian footballers
Association football midfielders
Campeonato Brasileiro Série A players
Campeonato Brasileiro Série B players
Campeonato Brasileiro Série D players
K League 2 players
Red Bull Brasil players
Esporte Clube XV de Novembro (Piracicaba) players
Grêmio Esportivo Osasco players
Associação Atlética Caldense players
Esporte Clube Vitória players
Santos FC players
Seoul E-Land FC players
Brazilian expatriate footballers
Expatriate footballers in South Korea
Brazilian expatriate sportspeople in South Korea